Omorgus lindemannae is a species of hide beetle in the subfamily Omorginae and subgenus Afromorgus.

References

lindemannae
Beetles described in 1975